Solar Eclipse is a 1995 space flight simulation video game developed and published by Crystal Dynamics, released initially for the Sega Saturn in North America, Europe and Japan.

Solar Eclipse was developed under the title "Titan", but the American marketing team decided it would sell better if published as a sequel to the 1994 video game Total Eclipse, especially as the two featured similar gameplay and graphical style. In Japan and Europe, it was released as Titan Wars.

A port was released in Europe for the PlayStation, in November 1996.

Gameplay
Solar Eclipse is a hybrid of rail shooter an space combat simulation; the general direction of the ship's flight is locked in, but the player may maneuver vea substantial area, and can at certain points choose from multiple routes.

Reception
The four reviewers of Electronic Gaming Monthly gave the Saturn version a 7.75 out of 10 average. They praised the intense gameplay, the considerable strategy required to elude enemy fire, and the solid graphics. GamePros Captain Squideo had a more mixed reaction, criticizing the partially on-rails flight and saying the landscapes and enemies become repetitious. He concluded that the game is nonetheless fun to play and "eclipses most other shooters", but that these problems would discourage repeat plays.

References

1995 video games
Crystal Dynamics games
PlayStation (console) games
Rail shooters
Science fiction video games
Sega Saturn games
Space combat simulators
Video games developed in the United States
Video game sequels
Video games scored by Burke Trieschmann